Švejdík is a Czech surname. Notable people with the surname include:

Marcel Švejdík (born 1973), Czech footballer
Ondřej Švejdík (born 1982), Czech footballer

Czech-language surnames